Georgina Baillie is an English actor, artist, post-punk singer, songwriter, and formerly a burlesque performer.  Her stage names have included Voluptua and Georgie Girl. 

From 2010 to 2013 she worked as a backing vocalist for Adam Ant and during 2011-2012 as the lead singer of the band Georgie Girl and her Poussez Posse that toured with Ant in over 100 concerts.

In October 2008, Baillie and her grandfather, the actor Andrew Sachs, were the targets of a prank phone call by Russell Brand and Jonathan Ross that resulted in reverberations in the British media.

Early life
Baillie was born 7 July 1985 in East London UK. Her mother is voiceover artist Kate Sachs and her father the actor Charles Baillie. Her maternal grandfather is the actor Andrew Sachs.

Career

Music
Baillie has worked with a number of bands over the years. In 2010 she worked with MariaMaria to release a single, "Sonnet for a Vampire."  Baillie performed vocals, with Sarah White on bass and Corrine Aze "Hazel" Corleone on guitar. From 2010–2013, Baillie sang backing vocals for Adam Ant. At first she sang with Sarah White and later with Georgina "Twinkle" Leahy; she later sang backup alone. As a member of Ant's band "The Good, The Mad and the Lovely Posse" she appeared as a backing vocalist in Ant's "Cool Zombie" music video, released on Blueblack Hussar Records and in concert footage featured in The Blueblack Hussar, a documentary about Ant's early 2010s musical comeback directed by Jack Bond, as well as in extras included on the film's DVD release.

Baillie co-wrote two songs in response to the Johnathan Ross/Russell Brand incident discussed below. One was  "Gun In Your Pocket", a song by Ant with input from Baillie in which both Baillie and Brand are discussed. "Gun In Your Pocket" was written in 2010 as single for Ant's upcoming album Adam Ant Is the Blueblack Hussar in Marrying the Gunner's Daughter.' In the end the song was released in late 2012 as the B side of actual pre-album single "Cool Zombie". The other song was "Rubber Medusa" – a song addressed to Brand from Baillie's point of view, co-written with Ant.

From 2011 to 2012, Baillie was lead singer of the band Georgie Girl And Her Poussez Posse, which Ant mentored. There were two incarnations of Poussez Posse.  The original line-up featured Baillie with Fiona Bevan and Danie Cox both on guitars, Rachael Smith on drums and Molly Spiers Macleod (daughter of Spizz) on bass. Footage from early 2011 of a band meeting of this first incarnation at Ant's home is included in Bond's documentary.  They recorded a single of "Rubber Medusa" (b/w "Teacher") and an EP of four of Cox's songs. Both projects remain unreleased. Bevan left to concentrate on her own music in July 2011 and Cox, Smith and Spiers Macleod all abruptly left in September (to found their own band The Featherz, led by Cox). 

At this point, the second incarnation of the Posse was recruited, featuring the return of Corleone on guitar, drummer Jessica Rushton and future Curse of Lono bassist Charis Anderson. This version toured the UK, mainland Europe and Australia supporting Ant and his band between October 2011 and December 2012, with Baillie performing double duty every night as both the Posse's frontwoman and Ant's backing vocalist.

Early in 2013, Baillie dissolved the second Posse. She sang vocals and Corleone played guitar as the duo Vortex Empress. They produced two tracks, "Burn Me" and "Spellbound" and a music video for the former.  In 2014, she sang backing vocals in Guns2Roses, (a Guns 'N Roses tribute act). In 2016, she worked with Boz Boorer singing vocals on the track "Le Stalker" on Boorer's solo album Age of Boom.

John Robb of Louder Than War, in a full interview for the site, described Baillie's work as "punky burlesque". The London Evening Standard has profiled her music career  and musical collaboration and friendship with Ant. The Tampa Bay Times describes "Georgie Girl & Her Poussez Posse"'s music as "fresh and rough" comparing their sound to "Hole vs Garbage vs a sexy, roller-derby squad".

Burlesque
Baillie has worked in burlesque, some of her collaborators and projects include: Salvation Group, and Satanic Sluts Extreme, a  four piece "gothic burlesque" dance group originating as an offshoot of the online subculture "Satanic sluts" organised by Nigel Wingrove; her persona's stage name was Voluptua.  Self-described as: "four of the sexiest depraved London jezebels", they performed at Glastonbury music festival and in several music videos.

Acting
As well as showing her as backing vocalist and apprentice to Ant as noted above, her appearance in Jack Bond's documentary The Blueblack Hussar also features her life at Ant's house in early 2011 and her accompanying Ant as he goes about his comeback, including being in the studio for an early 2011 Xfm radio session. 

After she stopped working with Ant, Baillie studied acting at The Poor School of drama in London in the mid 2010s. In 2015, she debuted in the role of "Ruth" in the Harold Pinter's play The Homecoming. In 2021, she was cast in the lead role in White Witch, at the Bloomsbury Theatre (2021). In 2021 she appeared in the  Kevin Short film, Tom and his Zombie Wife.

Art
Baillie began producing cartoon-like drawings in 2017 as part of rehab. Later she began painting and producing silkscreen prints.

Controversy

During the 18 October 2008 episode of The Russell Brand Show, comedian Russell Brand and presenter Jonathan Ross called actor Andrew Sachs (Baillie's grandfather) live on air for an interview. When Sachs failed to take the call, Ross and Brand left a series of four "lewd" messages on Sachs' answering machine, about Baillie's sexual relationship with Brand. The incident was picked up by the tabloids, and later resulted in Brand and Radio 2 controller Lesley Douglas resigning from the BBC, Ross being suspended without pay for twelve weeks, and the BBC being fined £150,000 by Ofcom. The media referred to the incident as "Sachsgate". Sachs never gave his consent to have these messages to be broadcast on the air. This led to the estrangement of Baillie with her grandparents that lasted for years. The sociologist, Chris Rojeck, has described Ross and Brand's exploit as an "invasion of privacy", and states that "their remorse is not focused on Andrew Sachs or Georgina Baillie, the victims whose privacy has been violated" but rather the two comedians felt remorse for receiving negative public reactions and disapproval of their stunt.

In 2009, shortly after the incident, Adam Ant befriended Baillie, and they have remained close friends. For several years, Ant mentored Baillie and encouraged her to reconcile with her grandfather after the controversy.  He hired Baillie as his assistant to oversee his day to day calendar scheduling. He also asked her to perform back up vocals for his performances. He refers to himself as "her mentor" regarding the Sachsgate episode.

In 2019, eleven years after the incident, Brand met with Baillie in person, and formally apologised for the prank.

See also
 Women in punk rock

References

Women rock singers
English actors
Burlesque performers
1985 births
Living people